Letter from Secret is the fifth extended play (promoted fourth Korean EP) by South Korean girl group Secret. The EP was released on April 30, 2013 and contains four tracks. "YooHoo", the album's lead single, marked the group's return to aegyo-inspired songs such as "Shy Boy" and "Starlight Moonlight".

Promotion
Secret had their comeback performance on M! Countdown on May 2, 2013. The group also performed "YooHoo" on various music shows such as Music Bank, Music Core and Inkigayo in May and June 2013. Secret made a Japanese comeback on July 23, 2014 with the Japanese version of "YooHoo".

Track listing

Chart performance 
"YooHoo" peaked at number 5 on the Gaon Singles Chart and has 978,757 downloads. The EP has in total 1,063,071 DLs while it sold 8,532 copies.

Charts

Sales

Release history

Credits and personnel 
These credits were adapted from the Letter from Secret liner notes.

Kim Tae-sung – executive producer co-producing
Song Jieun – vocals
Han Sunhwa – vocals
Jun Hyoseong – vocals
Jung Hana – vocals, rap
Kang Jiwon – co-producing, songwriting, arranger, music
Kim Kibum – co-producing, songwriting,  music

References

External links
 

2013 EPs
Secret (South Korean band) EPs
Korean-language EPs
Kakao M EPs
TS Entertainment EPs